Burnham & Berrow Golf Club is a 27-hole members golf club in Somerset, England which has hosted many of the leading amateur golf tournaments in Britain, including the Brabazon Trophy and English Amateur.

History
The club was first opened as Burnham Golf Club on a 9-hole layout designed by Charles Gibson, however the club was extended to an 18-hole layout by William Herbert Fowler by 1910 and was renamed to its current name of Burnham & Berrow Golf Club. Even in its early years the course began to host high-level amateur tournaments hosting the British Ladies Amateur Golf Championship in 1906.

In 1913 a further redesign of the course was made by Harry Colt which redesigned the course into much of the layout that currently still stands, the work on this redesign was completed in 1923. Following the redesigns the club would go on to host the British Ladies Amateur Golf Championship again in 1923 and 1938 and the 1930 English Amateur.

The first professional at the club was John Henry Taylor, who would later go on to win 5 Open Championships and captain Great Britain at the 1933 Ryder Cup.

Following World War II the golf club struggled financially and was forced to sell some land and redesign several holes as a result. However, despite these difficulties it continued to attract some of Britain's top amateur competitions, including the 1956 Brabazon Trophy and the English Amateur in 1952, 1963 and 1971.

Having recovered financially, the 9-hole Channel course was designed by Fred Hawtree and built in 1977, bringing the total number of holes available to members up to the present-day number of 27.

In more recent years the championship course has continued to host several top amateur competitions. It has hosted the Brabazon Trophy a further 2 times in 1990 and 2006 and the English Amateur a further 2 times in 1981 and 2006. The championship course has also hosted to 1999 Jacques Léglise Trophy and the 2011 Boys Amateur Championship (alongside Enmore Park Golf Club) at Junior level.

Courses and scorecards

Championship course
The championship course is a full 18-hole links course and is the course on which all of the major competitions hosted by the club have been played. The scorecard for the championship course is as follows (all distances given in yards):

Channel Course
The Channel Course is an 18-hole course with nine greens. Each hole has 2 separate tee positions, one of which is used on each loop of nine. The course is a 5,819-yard par-70 off the men's white tees and a 5,038-yard par-70 of the women's tees.

Competitions hosted

English Men's Open Amateur Stroke Play Championship (Brabazon Trophy)
The club has hosted the English Men's Open Amateur Stroke Play Championship for the Brabazon Trophy on 3 occasions, with the following results:

English Amateur
The club has hosted the English Amateur on 6 occasions with the following results:

British Ladies Amateur Golf Championship
The club has hosted the British Ladies Amateur Golf Championship on 3 occasions, with the following results:

Jacques Léglise Trophy
The club hosted the Jacques Léglise Trophy amateur boys' team golf competition between Great Britain and Ireland and the Continent of Europe in 1999 with Great Britain and Ireland winning 15 points to 9.

Boys Amateur Championship
Burnham & Berrow has twice hosted the Boys Amateur Championship, with the following results

West of England Open Amateur Championship
The club annually hosts the West of England Open Amateur Championship, which is traditionally played in September and attracts many of the top amateur golfers from the region. It is now a world-ranking event, and boasts several recognizable names on the famous trophy.

See also
 List of golf courses in the United Kingdom

References

External links
Burnham & Berrow Golf Club - official club website

Golf clubs and courses in Somerset
Golf clubs and courses designed by Harry Colt